Sun Rockers Shibuya is a Japanese professional basketball team based in Tokyo and sponsored by Sega Sammy. Until 2000, the team was known as Hitachi Honsha Rising Sun. The team currently plays in the B.League.

Current roster

Notable players
To appear in this section a player must have either:
- Set a club record or won an individual award as a professional player.
- Played at least one official international match for his senior national team at any time.

Hitachi Osaka players
 Derek Grimm
 Haruyuki Ishibashi

Coaches

 Bob Pierce (1997-2001)
 Osamu Kuraishi
 Shuji Ono (2005-2013)
 Tim Lewis (2013–14)
 Michael Olson (2014–16)
 BT Toews (2016–17)
 Geoffrey Katsuhisa (2017-)
 Kyle Bailey (asst)

Arenas
Aoyama Gakuin University
Sumida City Gymnasium

Practice facilities

They practice at the Hitachi Kashiwa Gymnasium in Hitachidai, Kashiwa, Chiba.

External links
Official Site
Historical Finishes
Asia-basket.com presentation

 
Basketball in Tokyo
Basketball teams in Japan
Basketball teams established in 1935
Hitachi
1935 establishments in Japan